Cloud Pictures (1872) is a book by Francis H. Underwood. It comprises four fictional stories, "The Exile of von Adelstein's Soul", "Topankalon", "Herr Regenbogen's Concert", and "A Great-Organ Prelude", which are chiefly musical in theme.

External links
  A contemporary review of Cloud Pictures

1872 American novels